The National Amusement Park Historical Association (NAPHA) is an international organization dedicated to the preservation and enjoyment of the amusement and theme park industry – past, present and future.

NAPHA was founded in 1978 by a former employee of Chicago’s Riverview amusement park (closed 1967) and has grown through the years to include amusement park enthusiasts from around the world.

About

Since its founding in 1978, the National Amusement Park Historical Association (NAPHA) has worked closely with the amusement industry to further its mission of preserving its heritage and traditions.  As the world’s only organization dedicated to all aspects of the amusement industry, the organization fills a unique role.

As part of NAPHA’s mission to preserve the heritage and traditions of amusement parks, the organization tries to work with the industry to protect key components of its history.  NAPHA’s efforts have resulted in the preservation of several historic rides including: 
 The second Tilt-A-Whirl ever manufactured
 The only Teeter Dip in existence
 One of America's last remaining Venetian Swings rides, now at Crossroads Village, Flint, MI
 A 1936 Smith & Smith Chairplane, which found a new home at Bay Beach Park in Green Bay, WI.

But ride preservation goes beyond the restoration of actual rides.  NAPHA has also played an active role in recreating lost classics, providing vintage blueprints that led to the construction of the Raging Wolf Bobs at Geauga Lake, a modern version of the Bobs at Chicago’s defunct Riverview Park, and most recently, the re-creation of a classic wooden Flying Turns by Knoebels Amusement Resort in Pennsylvania.  In addition, NAPHA was the catalyst for the reconstruction of the Zippin' Pippin wooden coaster at Bay Beach.

Materials for these recreations came from NAPHA’s archives.  Located in a climate controlled storage facility outside Chicago, NAPHA’s holdings are highlighted by the John Caruthers Collection, quite possibly the largest collection of amusement park postcards with over 16,000 items, and Eugene K. Feerer Collection. Feerer was a former president of International Amusement Device. Inc. (IADI) the successor to National Amusement Devices (NAD).  In addition to a wealth of information on IADI, NAD and Dayton Fun House, the collection contains what is perhaps the largest collection of John A. Miller materials anywhere including blueprints, photographs and correspondence.

But NAPHA cannot preserve the industry alone and in 1993 it began its Life Membership Award to honor organizations from around the world that demonstrate a "commitment to preserving the heritage and traditions of the amusement park industry."  Since that time the award has been presented to Pleasure Beach, Blackpool, UK; Kennywood, West Mifflin, PA; Playland, Rye, NY and Knoebel’s Amusement Resort.  Each park was singled out for their extensive lineup of well-maintained historic amusement rides.

Preservation efforts

To further support its mission of preserving the heritage and tradition of the amusement industry, NAPHA established the Heritage Fund in 1994.  Using funds raised from member and industry donations, memorabilia auctions and other fundraising events, the fund had succeeded in donating nearly $40,000 to organizations working to protect industry history.  Recipients have included industry related museums, groups working to preserve or restore specific historic rides and non-profit operators of amusement parks.

Annual members survey

In 1986, NAPHA became first organization to survey its members on a regular basis.  Initially intended to provide feedback to NAPHA’s Executive Committee, it soon became an anxiously awaited listing of favorite parks and attractions by an experienced group of amusement park visitors.  Many parks, including Busch Gardens in Williamsburg, VA, and Knoebels Amusement Resort in Elysburg, PA, use the results in their promotional campaigns.  In Spring 2012, the results of the 26th annual members’ survey were announced.  For the 22nd consecutive year, Busch Gardens, Williamsburg, VA, has been selected as the Most Beautiful Park.

Other 2012 favorites include:

 Favorite Traditional Amusement Park – Kennywood, West Mifflin, PA
 Favorite Theme Park – Walt Disney World, Lake Buena Vista, FL
 Best Park for Families – Knoebels Amusement Resort, Elysburg, PA
 Favorite Wood Roller Coaster – Phoenix, Knoebels Amusement Resort, Elysburg, PA
 Favorite Steel Roller Coaster – Millennium Force, Cedar Point, Sandusky, OH
 Best New Attraction – Zippin Pippin, Bay Beach Amusement Park, Green Bay, WI

Events
Each summer NAPHA hosts two or three special events, inviting its members from around the world to experience an amusement park in a unique way.  NAPHA visits parks of all shapes and sizes from the largest theme parks to smaller family owned facilities, but whenever possible, focuses its events on amusement parks celebrating major anniversaries.  Since its founding, NAPHA has honored 18 amusement parks that have celebrated their 100th anniversary, including 17 of the 41 in the United States that have hit that milestone.  The organization has also been on hand for four 125th anniversaries, a 90th, three 75ths, a 50th and a 25th. The 2019 event will be a 'Milestone Celebration' at Morey's Pier, Playland's Castaway Cove, and Gilligan's Wonderland along the Jersey Shore. 2020 will highlight the 100th anniversary of the Wonder Wheel, located at Deno's Wonder Wheel Park, Coney Island, NY.

Past conventions have included tours of amusement parks in Europe, Great Britain and California; Anniversary Celebrations at Cedar Point (Ohio), Kennywood (Pennsylvania), Knoebels Amusement Resort (Pennsylvania), Seabreeze (New York), Waldameer Park (Pennsylvania) and Idlewild and Soak Zone (Pennsylvania); and weekends visiting amusement parks on the Jersey Shore and in the New England, Denver, and Minneapolis areas.  Other recent host parks have included Busch Gardens (Virginia), Indiana Beach (Indiana), Kings Island (Cincinnati), Dollywood (Tennessee) and Holiday World (Indiana).

Conventions typically include an opening party/reception, a picnic lunch, behind the scenes tours, a memorabilia auction and numerous exclusive ride times on the park’s roller coasters and other unique and historic rides.

References

External links 
 National Amusement Park Historical Association

Amusement parks
History organizations based in the United States
Entertainment industry associations
Non-profit organizations based in Illinois
1978 establishments in Illinois
Lombard, Illinois